Two ships of the United States Navy have been named Caldwell, in honor of Lieutenant James R. Caldwell.

References

United States Navy ship names